Matías Waldemar Rosas Calisto (born 1 February 1998) is a Chilean professional footballer who plays as a forward for Chilean club Lautaro de Buin.

References

External links
 

1998 births
Living people
People from Ancud
Chilean footballers
Club Deportivo Universidad Católica footballers
Puerto Montt footballers
Deportes Copiapó footballers
Lautaro de Buin footballers
Chilean Primera División players
Primera B de Chile players
Segunda División Profesional de Chile players
Association football forwards